Gervais-François Couperin (22 May 1759 – 11 March 1826) was a representative of the famous Couperin family of composers and organists.

Biography 
He studied with his father Armand-Louis Couperin. In 1789, Gervais-François replaced his father at the Sainte-Chapelle organ. Gervais-François succeeded his brother Pierre-Louis Couperin at Notre-Dame de Paris, a position he held until the Revolution. He was later an organist at St-Gervais-et-St-Protais and Saint-Merri (1818–1826).

He married Hélène Thérèse Frey, a singer, with whom he had a daughter, Céleste Thérèse (1793–1860), also an organist.

Gervais-François Couperin died in Paris on 11 March 1826 at the age of 66.

Works 
1782: Rondo in D major for harpsichord or pianoforte
1788: Deux Sonates Op. 1 for harpsichord or pianoforte with violin and violoncello ad libitum 
1790: Ah ! Ça ira !, variations for harpsichord
1797: Ouvertures d'Iphigénie et de Démophon for the pianoforte and violin ad libitum
1797: Les Incroyables et Les Merveilleuses for pianoforte
1799: Premier Recueil contenant six Romances, avec accompagnement de piano-forte ou harpe
1816: Louis XVIII ou le Retour du bonheur en France.

See also 
 Couperin family

Bibliography 
Anthony, James R. (1997), French Baroque Music from Beaujoyeulx to Rameau, Portland, Amadeus Press
Beaussant, Philippe (1980), François Couperin, Paris, Fayard 
Benoit, Marcelle (rep.) (1992), Dictionnaire de la musique en France aux XVII et XVIIIe siècles, Paris, Fayard,

References

External links 
 
 Gervais Francois Couperin on Musicologie.org
 Gervais Francois Couperin, récit de cromorne by Éric Dalest on YouTube
 Gervais François Couperin on Musicalics

French classical organists
French male organists
Musicians from Paris
1759 births
1826 deaths
French classical composers
French male classical composers
Male classical organists